Stratford station is a commuter rail station on the Metro-North Railroad's New Haven Line and CTrail's Shore Line East, located in Stratford, Connecticut.

History
The station opened on December 25, 1848.

Waterbury Branch service at Stratford was suspended indefinitely on April 6, 2020, due to the coronavirus pandemic. Shore Line East service was suspended indefinitely on March 16.

Station layout
The station has two high-level side platforms, each four cars long, serving the four tracks of the Northeast Corridor. The station has 294 parking spaces, which are all owned by the state.

The National Helicopter Museum is located in the eastbound (south) station building, which no longer serves passengers.

References

External links

Main Street entrance from Google Maps Street View

Metro-North Railroad stations in Connecticut
Shore Line East stations
Stations on the Northeast Corridor
Stations along New York, New Haven and Hartford Railroad lines
Railroad stations in Fairfield County, Connecticut
Buildings and structures in Stratford, Connecticut
Railway stations in the United States opened in 1848